James Malcolm Steadman (born 15 February 1983) is an English cricketer who played for Bedfordshire County Cricket Club in four List A games.

References

1983 births
Living people
English cricketers
Bedfordshire cricketers
Sportspeople from Bedford